Łuknajno is a village in the administrative district of Gmina Mikołajki, within Mrągowo County, Warmian-Masurian Voivodeship, in northern Poland. It is close to and shares its name with Łuknajno Lake, a UNESCO Biosphere Reserve and Ramsar site.

References

Villages in Mrągowo County